Isabelle Helen Jordansson (born 8 March 1991 in Danderyd, Sweden) is a Swedish ice hockey forward.

International career
Jordansson was selected for the Sweden women's national ice hockey team in the 2010 Winter Olympics. She played in all five games, recording three assists. She also appeared for Sweden at two IIHF Women's World Championships. Her first appearance came in 2008. She made two appearances for the Sweden women's national under-18 ice hockey team, at the IIHF World Women's U18 Championships in 2008 and 2009, including winning a bronze medal in the 2009 event.

Career statistics

International career

References

External links
Eurohockey.com Profile
Sports-Reference Profile

1991 births
Living people
Ice hockey players at the 2010 Winter Olympics
Olympic ice hockey players of Sweden
People from Danderyd Municipality
Swedish women's ice hockey forwards
Sportspeople from Stockholm County